The 1957–58 Iowa State Cyclones men's basketball team represented Iowa State University during the 1957-58 NCAA College men's basketball season. The Cyclones were coached by Bill Strannigan, who was in his fourth season with the Cyclones. They played their home games at the Iowa State Armory in Ames, Iowa.

They finished the season 15–8, 8–4 in Big Eight play to finish in a tie for second.

Roster

Schedule and results 

|-
!colspan=6 style=""|Regular Season

|-

References 

Iowa State Cyclones men's basketball seasons
Iowa State
Iowa State Cyc
Iowa State Cyc